Monterey is an unincorporated community in Mercer County, in the U.S. state of Ohio.

History
Monterey was laid out in 1849.

References

Unincorporated communities in Mercer County, Ohio
Unincorporated communities in Ohio